Shomron Ben-Horin (born 1968) (Hebrew: שומרון בן-חורין) is an Israeli physician, a co-founder & Chief Medical Officer of Evinature, and professor of medicine at the Tel-Aviv University. 

Shomron Ben-Horin was born and raised in Tel Aviv, Israel.  

He received his MD from the Hadassah School of Medicine of the Hebrew University of Jerusalem before completing his gastroenterology training at Sheba Medical Center in Tel Aviv.

Medical career 

Ben-Horin is the chief of the Gastroenterology Department at Sheba Medical Center, Israel. He was previously Director of the inflammatory bowel disease service at the Sheba Gastroenterology Department.

He was a postdoctoral scientist in the laboratory of human immunology at NewYork-Presbyterian Hospital, and in 2015, was adjunct professor of medicine at the 1st Affiliated Hospital of Sun Yat-sen University, Guangzhou, China. 

After his successful trial on Curcumin in Combination with Mesalamine for Ulcerative Colitis, Ben-Horin founded Evinature with his research partner, Nir Salomon in 2020.

Professional organizations 

Ben-Horin is the president of the Israel IBD Society. He has served as Associate Editor of the Journal of Crohn's & Colitis (JCC) and is currently a member of the Editorial Board of Gut (journal) and the Scientific Committee of the European Crohn’s & Colitis Organization (ECCO). 

He has also served as a member of the steering committee of the Israeli Gastro Association, and is the Director of IBD Passport, a web-based global support program for traveling IBD patients.

Clinical and scientific fields of interest 

Ben-Horin’s main research focus is drug mechanisms, therapeutic drug monitoring and immunogenicity of biologics, response to biologic antibody drugs in IBD, and opportunistic infections in IBD.

He has authored over 60 peer-reviewed articles, and served as the principal investigator and sub-investigator in over 20 clinical trials, notably two multi-center prospective randomized controlled trials: Comparison of steroids+5ASA versus steroids alone in acute severe UC (7 sites in Israel, Europe, China and Korea) and one placebo-controlled RCT of Curcumin as add-on therapy for mild-moderate active UC (Israel, Cyprus and Hong-Kong).

Ben-Horin has been invited to lecture at the United European Gastroenterology Week (UEGW), the European Society for Paediatric Gastroenterology (ESPGHAN), the European Congress of Infectious Diseases, the National Congresses of Gastroenterology Societies, China Gastroenterology National Congress, and the IBD congress at Amsterdam Medical Center AMS, amongst other global IBD congress and research meetings. 

He has made FDA & EMEA Expert appearances on behalf of bio-pharma, is a consultant to several bio-tech and bio-pharma companies and was involved in the initiation of the CONFER project by the European Crohn’s & Colitis Organization.

Publications 

 Ben-Horin, S., Farfel Z., Mouallem, M. (2002), "Gastroenteritis-associated hyperamylasemia: Prevalence and clinical significance". Arch Intern Med. 
 Ben-Horin, S., Bardan, E., Barshack. (2003), "Cholesterol crystal embolization to the digestive system: characterization of a common, yet overlooked presentation of atheroembolism". Am J Gastroenterol. 
 Ben-Horin, S., Green, PHR., Bank, I. (2006), "Characterizing the circulating Gliadin-specific CD4+ memory T-cells in patients with celiac disease: Linkage between memory function, gut homing and Th1 polarization." J Leukoc Biol. 
 Ben-Horin, S., Bar-Meir, S., Avidan, B. (2007), "The impact of colon cleanliness assessment on endoscopists' recommendations for follow-up colonoscopy". Am J Gastroenterol 
​ Ben-Horin, S., Bar-Meir S., Avidan B. (2009), "The outcome of a second preparation for colonoscopy after preparation failure in the first procedure". Gastrointest Endosc 
 Ben-Horin, S., Goldstein, I., Fudim, E. (2008), "Thiopurines' delayed-onset of the anti-inflammatory effect: Early preservation of immune effector functions followed by eventual memory cell depletion". Gut 2009
 Ben-Horin, S., Margalit, M., Bossuyt, P. (2009), "The impact of concomitant treatment by immuno-modulators and antibiotics on the outcome of C. difficile-associated inflammatory bowel disease exacerbation". Clin Gastroenterol Hepatol 
 Ben-Horin, S., Yavzori, M., Katz, L. (2011), "The immunogenic part of infliximab is the F(ab')2 fragment, but measuring antibodies to the intact infliximab molecule is more clinically useful." Gut 2011
 Ben-Horin, S., Yavzori, M., Kopylov, U. (2011), "Detection of Infliximab in breast milk of nursing mothers with inflammatory bowel disease". J Crohn & Colitis 
 Ben-Horin, S., Mazor, Y., Yanai, H., etc. (2012), "The decline of anti-drug antibody titers after discontinuation of anti-TNFs: Implications for predicting re-induction outcome in IBD". Aliment Pharmacol Ther 2012
 Ben-Horin, S., Bujanover, Y., Goldstein, S. (2012), "Travel associated health risks for patients with inflammatory bowel disease". Clin Gastroenterol Hepatol 
 Ben-Horin, S., Polak-Charcon, S., Barshack, I. (2013), "Celiac disease resolution after allogeneic bone marrow transplantation is associated with absence of Gliadin-specific memory response by donor-derived intestinal T-cells". J Clin Immunol
 Ben-Horin, S., Waterman, M., Kopylov, U. (2013), "Elimination of detectable anti-infliximab antibodies and reversal of loss of response by the addition of an immuno-modulator". Clin Gastroenterol Hepatol
 Ben-Horin, S., Chowers, Y., Ungar, B. (2015), "Undetectable anti-TNF drug levels in patients with long-term remission predict successful drug withdrawal". Aliment Pharmacol Ther
 Ben-Horin, S. (2015), "Drug Level-based Anti-Tumor Necrosis Factor Therapy: Ready for Prime Time?". Gastroenterology (Editorial)
 Lang, A., Salomon, N., Ben-Horin, S., etc (2015), "Curcumin in Combination With Mesalamine Induces Remission in Patients With Mild-to-Moderate Ulcerative Colitis in a Randomized Controlled Trial". Clinical Gastroenterology and Hepatology.
 Ben-Horin, S., Itzhaki, Z., Haj-Natour, O. (2016), "Rarity of Adenomatous polyps in ulcerative colitis: Implications for colonic carcinogensis". Endoscopy 2016.
 Ben-Horin, S., Yavzori, M., Benhar, I. (2016), "Cross-immunogenicity: Antibodies to infliximab in Remicade-treated IBD patients similarly recognize the bio-similar Remsima". Gut 2016.
 Ben-Horin, S., Andrews, JM., Katsanos, KH. (2017), "Combination of corticosteroids and 5-aminosalicylates or corticosteroids alone for patients with moderate-severe active ulcerative colitis: A global survey of physicians' practice". World J Gastroenterol.
 Ben-Horin, S., Ungar, B., Kopylov, U. (2018), "Safety, efficacy and pharmacokinetics of vedolizumab in patients with simultaneous exposure to an anti-tumour necrosis factor".  Aliment Pharmacol Ther.
 Ben-Horin, S., Lahat, A., Amitai, MM. (2019), "Assessment of small bowel mucosal healing by video capsule endoscopy predicts short and long-term risk of Crohn’s disease flare: A prospective cohort study." Lancet Gastroenterol Hepatol.
 Ben-Horin, S., Novack, L., Mao, R. (2021) "Efficacy of Biologic Drugs in Short-Duration Versus Long-Duration Inflammatory Bowel Disease: A Systematic Review and an Individual-Patient Data Meta-Analysis of Randomized Controlled Trials." Gastroenterology.

References 

Israeli expatriates in the United States
Living people
Israeli expatriates in China
Academic staff of Tel Aviv University
Scientists from Tel Aviv
Hebrew University-Hadassah Braun School of Public Health and Community Medicine alumni
20th-century Israeli physicians
21st-century Israeli physicians
1968 births